Bebearia nivaria, the bicolour forester, is a butterfly in the family Nymphalidae. It is found in Nigeria, Cameroon, Gabon, the Republic of the Congo, the Central African Republic and the Democratic Republic of the Congo. The habitat consists of primary forests.

Subspecies
Bebearia nivaria nivaria (Nigeria, Cameroon, Gabon, Congo, Central African Republic, western Democratic Republic of the Congo)
Bebearia nivaria tenuimacula Berger, 1981 (Democratic Republic of the Congo: Mongala, Uele, Tshopo, north Kivu, Equateur and Sankuru)

References

Butterflies described in 1871
nivaria
Butterflies of Africa
Taxa named by Christopher Ward (entomologist)